A Turing machine is an abstract mathematical computational device named after Alan Turing; see the box for variants of this meaning. Turing machine may also refer to:

Automatic Computing Engine, an early computer designed by Turing using vacuum tubes and mercury delay lines
Bombe, a machine built by Turing and others to decipher German codes during World War II
Turing Machine (band), New York based instrumental rock band founded in 1998

See also
Turing test, a test of whether a machine has human-level intelligence